Eyton upon the Weald Moors is a civil parish in the district of Telford and Wrekin, Shropshire, England.  It contains twelve listed buildings that are recorded in the National Heritage List for England.  Of these, one is at Grade II*, the middle of the three grades, and the others are at Grade II, the lowest grade.  The parish contains the village of Eyton upon the Weald Moors, and is otherwise entirely rural.  The Shrewsbury Canal, now disused, was built through the parish and joined its Newport Branch at Wappenshall Junction.  A number of structures associated with the canal are listed, including a roving bridge, two warehouses, a toll office, and a lock keeper's cottage.  The other listed buildings are houses and cottages, a farmhouse, a barn, a church, and a country house.


Key

Buildings

References

Citations

Sources

Lists of buildings and structures in Shropshire